The mayor of Chiayi is the chief executive of the government of Chiayi City. The current mayor is Huang Min-hui of Kuomintang since 25 December 2018.

List of mayors
This list includes mayors of the city's county-administered era (1952–1982) and provincial era (1982–present). During the city's provincial era, all but one of the city's elected mayors were women.

County-administered City era

Provincial City era

Timeline

References

External links 
 Mayors - Chiayi City Government 

Chiayi